Adam and Eve and Pinch Me (2001) is a psychological thriller novel by English crime writer Ruth Rendell.

References

2001 British novels
Novels by Ruth Rendell
Hutchinson (publisher) books
Crown Publishing Group books
Doubleday Canada books